The 2016 Singapore Grand Prix (formally known as the 2016 Formula 1 Singapore Airlines Singapore Grand Prix) was a Formula One motor race held on 18 September 2016 at the Marina Bay Street Circuit in Marina Bay, Singapore. It was the fifteenth round of the 2016 Formula One World Championship, and marked the seventeenth running of the Singapore Grand Prix and the ninth time the race had been held at Marina Bay.

Mercedes driver Lewis Hamilton entered the race leading the World Drivers' Championship by two points, ahead of teammate Nico Rosberg. In the World Constructors' Championship, Mercedes held a lead of 208 points. Red Bull Racing was placed second and Ferrari third. Ferrari driver Sebastian Vettel was the defending race winner.

Rosberg started the race from pole position and led throughout, holding off a late challenge by Daniel Ricciardo to win by less than half a second in his 200th race in Formula One. Sebastian Vettel was awarded the Driver of the Day award after moving 17 spots to claim 5th position.

Qualifying

Notes:
 – Sergio Pérez received a five-place grid penalty for failing to slow for yellow flags and an additional three-place grid penalty for passing Esteban Gutiérrez under yellows.
 – Romain Grosjean received a five-place grid penalty for a new gearbox.
 – Sebastian Vettel received a five-place grid penalty for unscheduled gearbox changes, and a twenty-place grid penalty for using additional power unit elements.

Race
Romain Grosjean was unable to start the race due to brake problems. At the start Nico Rosberg got away in the lead and Fernando Alonso made a strong start up to 5th. Carlos Sainz collided with Nico Hülkenberg sending the latter into the pit wall and out of the race, while Sainz was able to continue. The safety car was deployed while Hülkenberg's car was cleared. As the safety car came in and the race resumed a Marshall was still on the track still picking up debris from the accident. After the restart Lewis Hamilton could not overtake Rosberg and Daniel Ricciardo ahead of him. Jenson Button retired from the race at two-thirds distance with a brake issue. Rosberg won the race after having to withstand late race pressure from Ricciardo with Lewis Hamilton driving a steady race to 3rd. Kimi Räikkönen came home 4th ahead of his teammate Sebastian Vettel while Max Verstappen was able to take 6th with Fernando Alonso falling back to 7th.

Race classification

Championship standings after the race
Bold text indicates who still had a theoretical chance of becoming World Champion.

Drivers' Championship standings

Constructors' Championship standings

 Note: Only the top five positions are included for both sets of standings.

Footnotes

References

External links

Singapore Grand Prix
Singapore
Grand Prix
Singapore Grand Prix